Below is an episodic synopsis of Devotion, which consists of 25 episodes and broadcast on MediaCorp Channel 8.

Episodic Synopsis

See also
List of programmes broadcast by Mediacorp Channel 8
Devotion

Lists of Singaporean television series episodes